World University of Bangladesh often abbreviated as (WUB) is a private university in Dhaka, Bangladesh. Abdul Mannan Chowdhury is the vice-chancellor of the University.

History
World University of Bangladesh (WUB) established in 2003 under the private University Act, 1992 (amended in 1998) and private university Act 2010, approved and recognized by the Ministry of Education, Government of the People's Republic of Bangladesh and the University Grants Commission (UGC) of Bangladesh is a leading university for quality and utilitarian education. His Excellency the President of People's Republic of Bangladesh is the Chancellor of the university. The WUB is a non-profit making concern - and governed by a 9 Member board of trustees constituted as per private universities Act 1998 (Amended in 2010).

Administration
The university as per requirement of the private universities Act. 2010, has a board of trustees consisting of 9 Members. The Board is entrusted with the responsibilities of financing the university and determining the strategies and policies of the university.

List of vice-chancellors 
 Abdul Mannan Choudhury (current).

Academics

Degree programs
WUB offers the following programs from its 3 faculties.

Faculty of Business Studies
• Bachelor of Business Administration (BBA)
• Bachelor in Tourism and Hospitality Management (BHTM)
• MBA (Regular)‑ 2 years
• MBA (Executive)‑ 1 year
• MBE (Master of Business Education)‑ 1.5 to 2 years

Faculty of Science & Engineering *
• B.Sc. in Computer Science & Engineering (CSE)
• B.Sc. in Computing & Information Science (CIS)
• B.Sc. in Electrical & Electronic Engineering (EEE)
• B.Sc. in Civil Engineering(CE)
• B.Sc. in Mechatronics Engineering (MTE)
• B.Sc. in Textile Engineering (TE)
• Bachelor of Architecture
• Bachelor of Pharmacy

Faculty of Arts & Humanities
Department of Law
• Bachelor of Laws (LL.B) ‑ 4 years
• Bachelor of Laws (LL.B) ‑ 2 years
• Master of Laws (LL.M) – 1–2 years
Department of English
• BA in English ‑ 4 years
• MA in English ‑2 years
• MA in English ‑1 year

Student life

Co-curricula and extra curricula activities
All the departments of the university arranged seminar, symposium, study tour etc. to encourage the students in linking the theories in reality. Besides, the university has many clubs and societies which offer extra-curricula activities. To develop leadership faculties, the students are encouraged to participate in indoor and outdoor sports, cultural programs, debates, celebrations of National Days, Annual Picnic, Excursion etc.

Festival
Every year WUB arranges two days CSE Festival. The festival offers Inter University Project showcasing, Robotics Contest, college level debating contest, IT Olympiad, Seminars, Workshops and Gaming Contest. Every year more than fifty universities and twenty school and college participate in the festival.

Footnotes

External links
 WUB official website
 Library
 Permanent Campus Location on Google

Private universities in Bangladesh
Educational institutions established in 1998
1998 establishments in Bangladesh
Educational institutions established in 2003
2003 establishments in Bangladesh
Universities of Uttara
Universities and colleges in Dhaka